Compsoctena montana is a moth in the family Eriocottidae. It was described by Wolfgang Dierl in 1970. It is found in Tanzania.

References

Moths described in 1970
Compsoctena
Lepidoptera of Tanzania